Mikhail Vasilyevich Mishchenko (born 27 June 1989) is a Russian professional footballer who plays for Kazakh side Zhetysu.

Career
He made his debut in the Russian Premier League on 15 March 2009 in a game against PFC Spartak Nalchik. In 2010, he was loaned out to FK Ventspils in Latvia, but played only 6 matches there, returning to FC Rubin Kazan after the end of the season.

On 18 February 2020, FC Taraz announced the signing of Mishchenko. He left the club again in January 2021.

References

External links

1989 births
People from Udmurtia
Living people
Russian footballers
Russian expatriate footballers
Russia youth international footballers
Russia under-21 international footballers
Association football defenders
Russian expatriate sportspeople in Latvia
Russian expatriate sportspeople in Belarus
Russian expatriate sportspeople in Kazakhstan
Expatriate footballers in Latvia
Expatriate footballers in Belarus
Expatriate footballers in Kazakhstan
Russian Premier League players
Kazakhstan Premier League players
FC Rubin Kazan players
FC Akhmat Grozny players
FC Spartak Vladikavkaz players
FK Ventspils players
FC Torpedo Moscow players
FC Angusht Nazran players
FC Sokol Saratov players
FC Sakhalin Yuzhno-Sakhalinsk players
FC Tosno players
FC Luch Vladivostok players
FC Sibir Novosibirsk players
FC Tambov players
FC Torpedo-BelAZ Zhodino players
FC Taraz players
FC Kaisar players
Sportspeople from Udmurtia